Company clerk is a person who keeps files, does secretarial work, etc., at an office or military company, camp or base.

Military specialisms